Krachiopsis is a genus of minute marine gastropod molluscs in the family Cerithiopsidae. Its only species is Krachiopsis giannuzzii. The species was described by Smriglio and Mariottini in 1999.

References

Gastropods described in 1999
Cerithiopsidae
Monotypic gastropod genera